Meltdown may refer to:

Science and technology
 Nuclear meltdown, a severe nuclear reactor accident
 Meltdown (security vulnerability), affecting computer processors
 Mutational meltdown, in population genetics

Arts and entertainment

Music
 Meltdown (festival) in London 
 Meltdown Records, a Slovakian record label

Albums
 Meltdown (Ash album) or the title song, 2004
 Meltdown (GrimSkunk album), 1996
 Meltdown (Icehouse album), 2002
 Meltdown (Massacre album), 2001
 Meltdown (Steve Taylor album) or the title song, 1984
 Meltdown (Vinnie Moore album) or the title song, 1991
 Meltdown (EP), by Pitbull, 2013
 Meltdown: Live in Mexico City, by King Crimson, or the title song, 2018
 Meltdown, by John Taylor, 1999
 Meltdown!, by Justin Roberts, 2006

Songs
 "Meltdown" (Love and Death song), 2013
 "Meltdown" (Stromae song), 2014
 "Meltdown", by AC/DC from Stiff Upper Lip, 2000
 "Meltdown!", by the Aquabats from Charge!!, 2005
 "Meltdown", by Live from The Distance to Here, 1999
 "Meltdown", by Loverboy from Keep It Up, 1983
 "Meltdown", by Quartz, 1989
 "Meltdown", from the film soundtrack album Requiem for a Dream, 2000

Publications
 Meltdown (Clearfield and Tilcsik book), 2018 on system failures
 Meltdown (Woods book), 2009, on the 2008 financial crisis
 Meltdown (Image Comics), a comic book mini-series
 Meltdown: The End of the Age of Greed, a 2009 book by Paul Mason
 Tabitha Smith, a Marvel Comics character, codename Meltdown

Film
 High Risk (1995 film), also known as Meltdown, a Hong Kong film starring Jet Li
 Meltdown (2004 film), a US film starring Bruce Greenwood
 Ice Age: The Meltdown, a 2006 animated film
 Meltdown: Days of Destruction, a 2006 US film starring Casper Van Dien

Television
 "Meltdown" (Farscape episode)
 "Meltdown" (JAG), an episode of JAG and the second part of the backdoor pilot of NCIS
 "Meltdown" (Red Dwarf), a television episode
 "Meltdown" (The Batman), a television episode
 Meltdown, a character in the 2007-2009 Transformers: Animated series
 The Meltdown with Jonah and Kumail, a stand-up comedy television series that aired on Comedy Central

Video games
 Meltdown (1986 video game), an action-adventure game for the Amstrad CPC
 Meltdown (Atari 7800), a light gun shooter video game
 Cinder (Killer Instinct), a character originally named Meltdown in the fighting game series
 Meltdown, a game by Jagex
 Meltdown, a (status) magic attack in Final Fantasy VIII
 Meltdown, an in-game movie in Grand Theft Auto V

Other uses 
 Tantrum, an emotional outburst
 Autistic meltdown, a stress reaction
 Meltdown (bar chain), a French bar chain